Point Calimere railway station (Tamil: கோடியர்கரை தொடர்வண்டி நிலையம்) is a terminal railway station belonging to the Southern Railway Zone of the Indian national railway system, in the Tiruchirappalli division. The station is located near Vedanthangal Bird Sanctuary and the Point Calimere Wildlife and Bird Sanctuary. The station serves the town of Kodiyarkarai, which is located on the Coromandel Coast. The railway station is not in service as its rails are being converted to broad gauge. This station is connected by the Thiruthuraipoondi Junction-Point Calimere railway line, which is also in the midst of a gauge conversion process. Point Calimere railway station lies 44.42 km away from Thiruthuraipoondi junction. The railway line consists of 8 railway stations along its entire Thiruthuraipoondi Junction-Point Calimere stretch, all of which are undergoing broad gauge conversions. Once the conversion is completed, the national railway system will resume rail services for the station.

History
Point Calimere railway station was built under British rule to transport salt and goods from the harbor. Later, a railbus was introduced on this route to serve the area's population. Nations second rail bus and south India's second rail bus operated till point Calimere railway station. When India gained independence IN 1947 the line was handed over to the Indian government.

References

Railway stations in Tiruchirappalli district